This is a list of electoral results for the Division of Oxley in Australian federal elections from the division's creation in 1901 until its abolition in 1934.

Members

Election results

Elections in the 1930s

1931

Elections in the 1920s

1929

1928

1925

1922

Elections in the 1910s

1919

1917

1914

1913

1910

Elections in the 1900s

1906

1903

1901

References

 Australian Electoral Commission. Federal election results
 Carr, Adam. Psephos

Australian federal electoral results by division